The 1960 Coppa Italia Final was the final of the 1959–60 Coppa Italia. The match was played on 18 September 1960 between Juventus and Fiorentina. Juventus won 3–2; it was their fourth victory.

Match

References 
Coppa Italia 1959/60 statistics at rsssf.com
 https://www.calcio.com/calendario/ita-coppa-italia-1959-1960-finale/2/
 https://www.worldfootball.net/schedule/ita-coppa-italia-1959-1960-finale/2/

Coppa Italia Finals
Coppa Italia Final 1960
Coppa Italia Final 1960